Aleksandr Aleksandrovich Yarkovoy (born 10 February 1993) is a Russian football defender.

Club career
He made his debut in the Russian Second Division for FC Lokomotiv-2 Moscow on 23 June 2011 in a game against FC Dnepr Smolensk.

He made his Russian Football National League debut for FC Khimki on 17 August 2016 in a game against FC Fakel Voronezh.

References

External links
 
 
 
 Aleksandr Yarkovoy at CFU

1993 births
Footballers from Moscow
Living people
Russian footballers
Association football defenders
FC Khimki players
Russia youth international footballers
Crimean Premier League players
FC Lokomotiv Moscow players
FC Dynamo Stavropol players
FC Krymteplytsia Molodizhne players
FC Olimp-Dolgoprudny players